Helen Aiyeohusa Ovbiagele (born 1944) is a Nigerian novelist. She was born in Benin City, and after attending C.M.S. Girls' School, Benin City, and St. Peter's College, Kaduna, she studied English and French at the University of Lagos and studied at the Institut Français du Royaume-Uni in London. Her work is associated with the romance genre, published in Macmillan's hugely popular Pacesetter Novels series, but her heroines are said to be a bit older and more independent than normal for that form. She is the Woman Editor of Vanguard newspaper.

Bibliography 

 Evbu My Love (1981)
 A Fresh Start (1982)
 You Never Know (1982)
 Forever Yours (1986)
 Who Really Cares (1986)
 The Schemers (1991)

References

Nigerian women novelists
1944 births
Living people
University of Lagos alumni
Writers from Benin City
20th-century Nigerian novelists
20th-century Nigerian women writers